The Way It Was may refer to:
The Way It Was (TV series)
The Way It Was (album), by Parachute, 2011
 "The Way It Was", a song from The Killers album Battle Born
"The Way It Was", a song by the Bee Gees released in 1976 from Children of the World

See also
The Way It Is (disambiguation)
The Way I Remember It (disambiguation)